Axel Erik Gustaf Björnström (born 10 September 1995) is a Swedish professional footballer who plays as a left back or left midfielder for AIK.

Club career
On 6 July 2021, Björnström signed a two-year contract with Russian Premier League club Arsenal Tula. On 8 March 2022, the president of Arsenal Tula confirmed that Björnström left the club earlier in the year.

On 9 March 2022, Björnström signed a contract with AIK until the end of 2024.

Career statistics

References

1995 births
Living people
Swedish footballers
Association football defenders
Vasalunds IF players
IK Sirius Fotboll players
FC Arsenal Tula players
AIK Fotboll players
Ettan Fotboll players
Allsvenskan players
Russian Premier League players
Swedish expatriate footballers
Expatriate footballers in Russia
Swedish expatriate sportspeople in Russia